Brimpton (Wasing Lower Farm) Airfield is an unlicensed single-runway civilian airfield in the south-east of West Berkshire, United Kingdom.

History
Close to RAF Greenham Common, the airfield was founded in the 1950s by Sir William Mount, a director at Miles Aircraft in Woodley, Berkshire. In the 1970s, the airfield was used by crop spraying contractors for local agriculture until 1979 when it was designated for public civilian use. Since 1983 there have been Percival Provost aircraft based at the strip.

Flying club and improvements
The airfield is the home of Brimpton Airfield Ltd. which has over 80 members. The strip has over 20 resident aircraft. The strip has in the early 2000s expanded, seeing a taxiway and aircraft hangars south of the runway.  The runway is being extended to 620 metres. Further outside open-ended hangars have been added.

From February 2017 the field offers outside tiedowns and open hangar space.

Two Yak18T aeroplanes are based at Brimpton and a Yak 50 is proposed.

Location
Brimpton Airfield is due south of a point equidistant between the Berkshire towns of Reading and Newbury, in the gently ascending fields south of the A4 road. Due to the airfield's close proximity to the Atomic Weapons Establishment in nearby Aldermaston, an R101(2.4) restriction is in place for the surrounding airspace, requiring all circuits to be completed to the north of the runway.  Within the R101 catchment, the airfield has special exemption from the Civil Aviation Authority of the United Kingdom (CAA).

Incidents
On 14 February 2009 a pilot sustained injury in crashing their microlight within the airfield's perimeter.
 On 5 June 2016 a Tiger Moth crashed on takeoff and collided with 2 parked cars.  A woman on the ground was injured.

References

Transport in Berkshire
Airports in South East England
Wasing